Harold John Stahl, Jr. (born November 16, 1944) is a former Republican member of the Pennsylvania House of Representatives.

References

Democratic Party members of the Pennsylvania House of Representatives
Living people
1944 births